Ectoedemia terebinthivora is a moth of the family Nepticulidae. It is only known from Greece (Ionian and Aegean islands) and Turkey (Anatolia).

The wingspan is 4.1-5.2 mm. Adults are on wing from June to July and from May to June. There are probably two generations per year.

The larvae feed on Pistacia terebinthus. They mine the leaves of their host plant. The mine consists of  a strongly contorted gallery with a narrow line of brown frass. Later, the mine widens into an elongate, irregular blotch with dispersed brown frass.

External links
Fauna Europaea
bladmineerders.nl
A Taxonomic Revision Of The Western Palaearctic Species Of The Subgenera Zimmermannia Hering And Ectoedemia Busck s.str. (Lepidoptera, Nepticulidae), With Notes On Their Phylogeny

Nepticulidae
Moths of Europe
Moths of Asia
Moths described in 1975